Burn It Black is the first and only studio album of the American rock band Injected. It was produced by Butch Walker and released on February 26, 2002 on Island Records.

Track listing
"When She Comes" – 2:33 Written by Daniel Blaine Grady
"Burn It Black" – 2:42 Daniel Blaine Grady, Slovisky
"Bullet" – 3:41 Daniel Blaine Grady
"Faithless" – 3:20 written by Daniel Blaine Grady
"Only Hurts Awhile" – 5:11 Daniel Blaine Grady
"I-IV-V" – 3:02 Daniel Blaine Grady
"Sherman" – 3:37 Daniel Blaine Grady/Lemons
"Used Up" – 3:44 Daniel Blaine Grady/Lemons
"Ms. Fortune" – 4:24 Daniel Blaine Grady
"Bloodstained" – 4:29 Daniel Blaine Grady
"Lights Are Low" – 2:40 Daniel Blaine Grady/Lemons/Butch Walker
"Dawn" – 4:00 Daniel Blaine Grady

Additional information
"Burn It Black" in the video games Project Gotham Racing, MX 2002 Featuring Ricky Carmichael, Backyard Wrestling Don't Try This At Home and on the soundtrack to the film The Scorpion King
The track "I-IV-V" was featured in the soundtrack of the movie Spider-Man.
"Faithless" appeared on the soundtrack to the movie The Fast and the Furious, More Fast and Furious. The song also made it onto the soundtrack for the MTV reality wrestling show Tough Enough.
There is a hidden track on the album called "Ride the Snake" that starts about a minute after "Dawn" is finished.

References

2002 debut albums
Injected (band) albums
Island Records albums
Albums produced by Butch Walker